Kavitha Ranjini, known by the stage name Urvashi, is an Indian actress, dubbing artist, television host, scriptwriter and producer known for her works in the Southern film industry, predominantly in Malayalam and Tamil films. She has acted in around 700 films.

She started her acting career as a child artist, in a Malayalam movie Vidarunna Mottukal, released in 1977. Her first released film as heroine was Mundhanai Mudichu (Tamil, directed by K. Bhagyaraj) in 1983. She was a prominent lead actress of the 1980s and 1990s, primarily in Malayalam Films. She has written the films Ulsavamelam and Pidakkozhi Koovunna Noottandu, the latter was also produced by her. She won the National Film Award for Best Supporting Actress for her performance in Achuvinte Amma (2005), which was her comeback film after a hiatus of 6 years. She has won the Kerala State Film Award for Best Actress a record five times, which includes three consecutive wins from 1989 to 1991. She has also received two Tamil Nadu State Film Awards.

Urvashi was born to popular drama actors Chavara V. P. Nair and Vijayalakshmi in Sooranad in Kollam district of Kerala .Her elder sisters are actors Kalaranjini and Kalpana. She married actor Manoj K. Jayan on 2 May 1998, which ended in divorce in 2008.

National Film Awards

Kerala State Film Awards

Tamil Nadu State Film Awards

Filmfare Awards South

Kerala Film Critics Association Awards

Vanitha Film Awards

Asianet Film Awards

Vijay Awards

South Indian International Movie Awards

Ananda Vikatan Cinema Awards 
{| class="wikitable" 
|-
! Year !! Category !! Film !! Result
|-
| 2007||  Best Actress in a Comedy (Tamil) || Malaikottai  || 
|-
| 2017 ||  Best Actress in a Comedy (Tamil) || Magalir Mattum || 
|-
|2020||  Best Actress in a Comedy (Tamil) || Dhilluku Dhuddu 2  || 
|-
| 2020||Aval Awards for Evergreen Heroine-2021 || Soorarai Pottru, Mookuthi Amman , Putham Pudhu Kaalai || 
|-
| 2020-21||Best Supporting Actress || Soorarai Pottru || 
|}
Amrita Film Awards
2005: Best Supporting Actress- Achuvinte Amma NANA FILM WEEKLY 

Other Film Awards
1983: Best New face Madras Telugu Film Academy Award - Mundhanai Mudichu (Tamil)
1984: Savithry Award for Best Actress - Mundhanai Mudichu1992: Ujala Award for Best Actress - Kizhakkan Pathrose & Venkalam (Malayalam)
1992: Kerala Film Chamber Award for Best Actress - Different Films (Malayalam)
1993: Ujala Award for Best Actress - Kalippattam & Sthreedhanam 
1993: Woman of the Year Award By Film Fans Association for various films
1994: Chennai Film City Academy Award for Best Actress - Naan Petha Magane & Vanaja Girija 
1996: Screen Videocon Award for Best Actress - Irattai Roja 
1997: Madras Film Academy Award for Best Actress by Tamil Nadu Government
1999: Film Council Audience Award for Best Actress - Garshom & Kottappurathe Koottukudumbam 
2005: Best Actress Award by Film Fans Association - Achuvinte Amma 
2005: Suvarna TV Special Award for Best Actress - Rama Shama Bhama (Kannada)
2009: Edison Awards (India) for Best Character (Female) - Siva Manasula Sakthi 
2010: Jaihind TV Special Award for Best Actress - Mummy & Me 
2010: Jayan Smaraka Award for Best Actress - Mummy & Me & Sakudumbam Shyamala2019: Creative Film Awards - Best supporting actress -Ente Ummante Peru''
2021: Women Achievers Awards

Television Awards
2008: Best Anchor award (Surya TV) for game show "Swarnamazha" (Malayalam)
2010: Popular Game Show (Surya TV) for "Rani Maharani" (Malayalam)
2002: Best Anchor Award (Raj TV Award) for "Take It Easy Urvashi" (Tamil)

References 

Urvashi